The Military Biscuit is a food component of the Swiss army.

History
Oscar J. Kambly, the second-generation boss of the traditional swiss company Kambly SA, developed the recipe for flavor-neutral pastries in 1959. It was to replace the military Zwieback known as Bundesziegel in German language (federal brick) and should be compatible  with cheese or sausage as well as with chocolate. It should have a shelf life of at least three years. Since 1959, the army has distributed about a million servings of the military biscuits to the soldiers every year. The military biscuits are also popular by the civilian population of Switzerland.

Some private traders sold military biscuits, which the DDPS initially wanted to prevent, because the trade with army food is forbidden. This is also noted on the packaging. Since 2010, Kambly, still a manufacturer of military biscuits, is allowed to sell these to large distributors. The packaging has to be different from the biscuits produced for the military.

Since 2009, the biscuits have also been distributed together with the military chocolate in a gift box with the dedication of the Chief of the Armed Forces to the soldiers who have fulfilled their military service obligations. 25,000 such gift boxes include the recurring yearly production for a year's release for the soldiers in Switzerland.

In addition to the standard packaging, the Military Biscuit is also available as promotional merchandise with two pieces packed to a 9g small packaging.

Ingredients and nutritional values
Ingredients
Wheat flour, potato starch, palm oil, glucose, sugar, powdered milk, malt, leavening agent, sodium hydrogencarbonate, ammonium bicarbonate, salt.

Nutritional values per 100 grams
450 kilo Calorie
14 grams of fat
73 grams of carbohydrates
15 grams of which sugars
6.9 grams of protein
1.9 grams of salt

References

External links
 Das Militär-Biscuit.
 Adrian Schulthess, Antonia Sell: Wieso darf Volg plötzlich Militär-Biscuits verkaufen? Why can Volg suddenly sell military biscuits? In: Blick,
 Armeeproviant. Militärbiscuit: Ein Klassiker – neu aufgelegt.Armeeproviant. Military Biscuit: A classic - reissued Website of the Logistikbasis der Armee.

History of food and drink
Military food
Military equipment of Switzerland
Sports nutrition
Swiss cuisine